Scramble, Scrambled, or Scrambling may refer to:

Arts, entertainment, and media

Games
 Scramble (video game), a 1981 arcade game

Music

Albums
 Scramble (album), an album by Atlanta-based band the Coathangers
 Scrambles (album)

Songs
 "Scramble" (song), a song by Yui Horie, opening of the anime series School Rumble

Other arts, entertainment, and media
 Scramble (comics), an enemy of the Marvel Comics Canadian superhero team Alpha Flight
 Scramble (film), a 1970 British drama film
 Scrambled!, a British children's television programme

Codes and language
 Scrambler, in telecommunications, a device that encodes a message at the transmitter to make the message unintelligible
 Scrambling (syntax), a linguistic term for variation of word order

Sports
 Scramble (golf), a team play format in golf
 Scrambling, a method of ascending rocky faces and ridges
 Motorcycle scrambling, a form of motorcycle racing or all-terrain vehicle racing held on enclosed off-road circuits
 Quarterback scramble, an impromptu play in Canadian and American football

Other uses
 Scramble (slave auction), an 18th-century form of slave auction
 Scrambling (military), rapid deployment of aircraft, usually fighters, to meet an incoming threat
 National Residency Matching Program, part of which was called "the Scramble," where United States medical students who did not match compete to get residencies
 Pedestrian scramble, a pedestrian crossing system that stops all traffic and allows pedestrians to cross intersections

See also
 Scrambled eggs, a dish made from the lightly beaten combined egg whites and yolks
 Scrambler (disambiguation)